John Lovelace, 2nd Baron Lovelace (February 1616 – 25 November 1670) was a British peer and Royal servant.

Life
John was born in Hurley, Berkshire the son of Richard Lovelace, 1st Baron Lovelace and his wife, Margaret, the daughter of London merchant William Dodworth, and educated at Christ Church, Oxford. He lived at Ladye Place at Hurley which he inherited on the death of his father. Like his son the third Baron, he was a notoriously heavy drinker, and chronically in debt.

He was an ardent Royalist and was committed by the Parliamentarians to the Tower of London and made to pay a heavy fine of 18,373l. 1s. 10d. After the restoration of the Monarchy, he was appointed Lord Lieutenant of Berkshire from 28 August 1660 to 25 November 1670. In 1670 he was made steward of the old Royal palace at Woodstock and died in the palace gatehouse on 25 September 1670. He was buried on 1 October 1670  in the old priory church in Hurley.

After his death, he was succeeded by his son John Lovelace, 3rd Baron Lovelace, who according to uncharitable acquaintances inherited both his father's debts and his weakness for drink. His wife Anne, daughter of Thomas Wentworth, 1st Earl of Cleveland and Anne Crofts, succeeded her niece as 7th Baroness Wentworth, which after her death passed to their granddaughter Martha Johnson. His daughter Dorothy Lovelace married Henry Drax (1641–1682), a plantation owner in Barbados.

References

Attribution

|-

1616 births
1670 deaths
People from Hurley, Berkshire
2
Lord-Lieutenants of Berkshire
Cavaliers
John, Baron 2nd